The Haeterini are one of the smaller tribes of the Satyrinae in the Nymphalidae (brush-footed butterfly) family. The tribe occurs exclusively in tropical rain forests in the Neotropical realm.

It contains 29 described species and 39 subspecies classified in the following five genera:
 Cithaerias Hübner, [1819]
 Dulcedo d'Almeida, 1951
 Haetera Fabricius, 1807
 Pierella Westwood, [1851]
 Pseudohaetera Brown, 1942

Notes

References

  (ed), 2004. Atlas of Neotropical Lepidoptera. Checklist: Part 4A Hesperioidea - Papiionoidea. Gainesville: Scientific Publishers/Association of Tropical Lepidoptera.
 , 2019. Species limits in butterflies (Lepidoptera: Nymphalidae): reconciling classical taxonomy with the multispecies coalescent. Systematic Entomology, in press. DOI: http://doi.org/10.1111/syen.12352.
 , 2009. Haeterini Herrich-Schaeffer 1864. Version 2 June 2009 (under construction). http://tolweb.org/Haeterini/70265/2009.06.02  in The Tree of Life Web Project.

External links
Pteron Images. In Japanese but with Latin scientific names

 
Satyrinae
Butterfly tribes